"Comet Chasers" is an episode of Thunderbirds Are Go. The episode aired in the UK on CITV and ITV on 19 December 2015. The episode features a guest appearance from comedian Jack Whitehall. Main characters Kayo Kyrano, Virgil Tracy and Gordon Tracy appear at the beginning but do not speak.

Plot
The episode begins with Alan Tracy talking about flying to Halley's Comet in his sleep. He is then woken up by Scott Tracy and Grandma Tracy. Grandma informs him about a broadcast to do with Halley's comet. Alan starts to state facts about the comet which he already has done multiple times according to Scott. The broadcast begins with Francois Lemaire and his wife visiting the comet where he decides to go inside the comet's tail. Scott yells at the broadcast about it being a bad idea, John Tracy pops up stating that they have a situation.

John briefs Alan and Scott on the details of the emergency and they dispatch in Thunderbird 3. When flying in space Scott tells Alan that Lemaire's ship is still intact but Alan is more interested in the comet. Scott reminds Alan that they are on a mission and they have to be focused on that.

On Lemaire's ship, Francois is trying to look at his ship's controls and his wife fires the emergency beacon which Thunderbird 3 pick up and Alan informs Scott. Francois discusses about all the times he has needed rescued. Alan and Scott are unable to communicate with Lemaire. Scott takes a pod vehicle to go and rescue Lemaire. Scott finds it hard to bypass the rocks until Alan told him to think like he is playing a game. When Scott reaches the ship he still fails to communicate with the ship so he decides to dock with the ship. Once docked Scott finally communicates with Francois. Scott orders Francois and his wife to put on their space suits. Suddenly a large rock hits the ship, Alan becomes worried when he can't communicate with Scott. Scott manages to reach Alan who is relieved to hear from Scott and informs him that they are on the comet.

Scott enters Lemaire's ship to assess the damage, Francois remembers Scott from the last time he's been rescued. Francois isn't impressed when Scott breaks the ship apart to try and find a way to get the ship running again. Francois threatens to sue International Rescue for the damages. Scott contacts Alan to collect them. Scott, Francois and his wife jump over bits of the comet until they see the ship get destroyed by the comet. Alan comes in to land near them and he then leaves Thunderbird 3 so he can stand on the comet. The comet shakes and Francois is knocked off and Alan goes to rescue him. Scott sends Alan his space-board. Alan surfs back into Thunderbird 3 and they then take off. When leaving the comet, two of Thunderbird 3's gets hit so they can't return to Earth for 36 hours. Francois is complaining about there being no food, Scott informs them that Brains made ration bars for long journeys and that the bars are in the bin.

Reception
Fred McNamara writing for Screen Relish stated "“Comet Chasers” will surely be brushed aside as one of the few bland episodes of Thunderbirds Are Go there’s been so far, but sadly this is an episode where what goes wrong outweighs what goes right." He went on to state "“Comet Chasers” has next to no fire in its belly, and whatever flames may be stirring just don’t know how to blaze away. This is a crying shame, because it starts off as an interesting development on Alan’s character and his fascination with outer space, but any sense of development is sidelined thanks to a rescue we’d rather not see and a script that has more debris floating around inside than Halley’s Comet itself."

Paul Simpson writing for Sci-Fi Bulletin gave the episode a 7 out of 10 rating and stated "Jack Whitehall gives a spot-on vocal performance as the exceptionally irritating and self-absorbed explorer at the heart of this tale, Francois Lemaire, which sees Scott and Alan take Thunderbird 3 (and its pod) through an asteroid field – with a nicely done reference to gaming a moment or two after the thought strikes the viewer that that’s what is going on." Simpson also stated "It’s quite a simple linear episode but there’s nothing wrong with the occasional “straightforward” rescue!"

References

External links

2015 British television episodes
Fiction about Halley's Comet
Animated television episodes
Television episodes set in outer space